The Howrah–Anand Vihar Yuva Express was a Yuva Express series train of Indian Railways, that connected Kolkata, the capital of West Bengal to Anand Vihar Terminal in Delhi, the national capital.

Eastern Railway cancelled its operations permanently from 19 May 2020.

History
The train was inaugurated by former railway minister Mamata Banerjee, to help the youths of both towns to ply in between. This train was considered to be the cheapest of all AC trains between the two cities.

Background
Sixty percent seats of the train were reserved for students, low-income groups & people belonging to the age group of 18-45yrs. To avail this facility, a traveller must had an age/income proof.

Composition
This train consisted of ten AC Chair Car coaches with five AC 3 Tier coaches and with two End-On-Generation Vans. This train ran with old ICF coaches with a green and yellow livery which is themed on vibrant, contrasting and lively youth of the nation. As of 2020, the use of ICF coaches was risky due to their old condition, as old Rajdhani coaches are of the 90s, they are not capable of running at speed such as 130 KMPH, thus on 19 May 2020 its services were discontinued.

Locomotive
The train was regularly hauled by a Howrah shed WAP-4 or WAP-7 locomotive.

See also
 Bandra Terminus–Hazrat Nizamuddin Yuva Express

References

Yuva Express trains
Trains from Howrah Junction railway station
Rail transport in Jharkhand
Rail transport in Uttar Pradesh
Railway services introduced in 2009
Delhi–Kolkata trains